Old Swinford Hospital RFC is the rugby union football club of Old Swinford Hospital School in Stourbridge. The school is acknowledged as one of the top rugby schools in the country, holding a highly successful playing record and with many players playing at regional level and an increasing number going on to play professionally and internationally.

Rugby at the school starts at Under-12 level and is played in individual year groups until Under-16 level where the players enter the senior rugby system, where there are four senior XV's for players to play in.

The school's 1st XV and U15 teams both compete in the Daily Mail Cup and it is not uncommon for the teams to reach the late stages of the competition, in the 2011/2012 season the 1st XV made it to the final of the U18 cup at Twickenham, unfortunately losing to Dulwich College 15–8. However Swinford scored the only try through Cass Brookes. Also, in the 2016/2017 season the 1XV managed to play at Sixways Stadium, Home of the Worcester Warriors to compete in the Natwest Bowl, which they won 25–13. This has led to a large following by members of the school both past and present. On many occasions a 1st XV match will attract a large proportion of the school community to the sidelines.

Unusual Matches

In the late 70's a game of Rugby was being played on Top Field, which concealed the old World War II air raid shelters, long since closed up.  During the game a maul was formed and the roof of the air raid shelter collapsed leading to the pile of players falling through the hole.  After that the field was not declared playable until the shelters had been filled and reinforced.

1st XV Captains

Coaches

Notable players
  Richard West
  Joe Shaw
  James Tideswell
  George Robson
  James Collins
  Chris Pennell
  Rhys Crane
  Daniel Willis (Ex Worcester Warriors player. Retired at age 19 due to a knee injury)
  Max Stelling (Worcester Warriors)
  Ed Taylor (Bedford Blues Rugby)
  Sam Smith (England U17, England U18)
 Huw Taylor (England U17, England U18)
 George Trimmer (Ex Nottingham Rugby & Worcester Warriors. Retired aged 21 due to Knee Injury)

Tours

1st XV Playing Record

Daily Mail Cup
2007/2008

1st Round: Bye

2nd Round

3rd Round

4th Round

5th Round

6th Round

Quarter Final

2006/2007

1st Round: Bye

2nd Round

3rd Round

4th Round

5th Round

2005/2006

1st Round: Bye

2nd Round: Bye

3rd Round

4th Round

5th Round

6th Round

Quarter Final

2004/2005

1st Round: Bye

2nd Round

3rd Round

4th Round

5th Round

6th Round

Quarter Final

Semi-Final

2003/2004

1st Round: Bye

2nd Round

3rd Round

4th Round

2002/2003

1st Round: Bye

2nd Round

3rd Round

4th Round

5th Round

6th Round

Quarter Final

2001/2002

1st Round: Bye

2nd Round

3rd Round

4th Round

2000/2001

1st Round

2nd Round

3rd Round

4th Round

The National Schools 7's
2009/2010

Final 16

Quarter Final

2007/2008

2006/2007

Final 16

Quarter Final

Semi-Final

2005/2006

2004/2005

Final 32

Final 16

2003/2004

Final 32

See also
 Old Swinford Hospital
 Daily Mail Cup
 The National Schools 7's

References

External links
 Old Swinford Hospital
 Old Swinford on Schools Rugby

Sport in Dudley
Stourbridge